Aaron Naughton (born 30 November 1999) is a professional Australian rules footballer playing for the Western Bulldogs in the Australian Football League (AFL). Standing at 195 cm, Naughton is considered a key-position player who is renowned for his strong marking skills and can play both in defence and attack.

He is known by his Western Bulldogs fans as the AstroNaught due to his surname and for his large leaps to grasp outstanding high-flying marks.

Early years
Naughton was born in the outer Melbourne suburb of Frankston and played junior football with the Frankston YCW Junior Football Club from Auskick through to under-9s. Naughton and his family moved to Rockingham, Western Australia in the summer of 1998-99. He was educated at Kolbe Catholic College, Rockingham.

AFL career
He was drafted by the Western Bulldogs with their first selection and ninth overall in the 2017 national draft.

Naughton went on to play 18 games in his debut season, finishing fourth in the club best-and-fairest count and winning the Chris Grant Best First Year Player Award. He also earned a Rising Star nomination for his performance against  in Round 23.
Naughton moved into the forward line at the beginning of 2019. This move proved to be a success and Naughton kicked 32 goals in his second year. Naughton led the AFL for contested marks at the conclusion of the 2019 season, with a total of 53. His contested marking was best on display in Round 7 against Richmond, claiming 9 contested marks, he was only 1 shy of the AFL record. Naughton kicked a career-high six goals in the 12th round of the 2020 AFL season against the Adelaide Crows.

Naughton had a career-best start to the 2021 AFL season, kicking multiple goals in every single game up to Round 9. He then had his best game for the season in Round 9, where he kicked 4 goals and helped secure the team a win against .

Career statistics summary
 Statistics are correct to the end of round 9, 2021

|-
|- style="background-color: #EAEAEA"
! scope="row" style="text-align:center" | 2018
|style="text-align:center;"|
| 33 || 18 || 2 || 1 || 130 || 78 || 208 || 77 || 38 || 0.1 || 0.1 || 7.2 || 4.3 || 11.6 || 4.3 || 2.1
|-
! scope="row" style="text-align:center" | 2019
|style="text-align:center;"|
| 33 || 23 || 32 || 27 || 170 || 80 || 250 || 132 || 42 || 1.4 || 1.2 || 7.4 || 3.5 || 10.9 || 5.7 || 1.8
|-style="background-color: #EAEAEA"
! scope="row" style="text-align:center" | 2020
|style="text-align:center;"|
| 33 || 12 || 15 || 6 || 46 || 38 || 84 || 42 || 9 || 1.3 || 0.5 || 3.8 || 3.2 || 7.0 || 3.5 || 0.8
|-
! scope="row" style="text-align:center" | 2021
|style="text-align:center;"|
| 33 || 9 || 22 || 16 || 90 || 26 || 116 || 64 || 14 || 2.4 || 1.8 || 10.0 || 2.9 || 12.9 || 7.1 || 1.6
|- class="sortbottom"
! colspan=3| Career
! 62
! 71
! 50
! 436
! 222
! 658
! 315
! 103
! 1.2
! 0.8
! 7.0
! 3.6
! 10.6
! 5.1
! 1.7
|}

Notes

References

External links

1999 births
Living people
Western Bulldogs players
Peel Thunder Football Club players
Australian rules footballers from Perth, Western Australia
People from Frankston, Victoria
Australian rules footballers from Melbourne
Sportsmen from Western Australia